Kwaku Manu (born March 6, 1984) is a Ghanaian actor, musician and presenter. In the year 2012 he released his first single  ''E'nfa nhoahoa ho''.

Personal life 
Kweku Manu was born and raised in Kumasi, Ashanti Region Of Ghana. He is married to Mrs Okaale and has two children.

Filmography 
He has been featured on several movies like:

 The Man With The Burning First
 The Great Battle 2.
 Who is Stronger?
 The Twin Spirit 3
 Kwaku Azonto

Awards and nomination 
He was nominated as Favorite Actor in the Ghana Movie Awards 2019 Edition.

Philanthropic work 
In the Year 2016 Kwaku Manu went in to support his colleague  actress Emelia Brobbey on her SAVE THE ORPHAN program  which made a lot of impact.

Features

Movies 

 Aboagye Brenya
 Agya Koo
 Lil Win
 Mercy Aseidu

References 

1984 births
Living people
Ghanaian actors
People from Kumasi